Elmyra may refer to:
 Elmyra Duff, a fictional character from Tiny Toon Adventures
 Elmyra Gainsborough,  a video game  character; see List of Final Fantasy VII characters#Elmyra Gainsborough
 a reference to Elmyr de Hory as "the Great Elmyra" in the Punk rock song No More Heroes by The Stranglers